Majhara Pipar Ehatmali is a census town in Unnao district in the Indian state of Uttar Pradesh.

Demographics
 India census, Majhara Pipar Ehatmali had a population of 16,808. Males constitute 54% of the population and females 46%. Majhara Pipar Ehatmali has an average literacy rate of 63%, higher than the national average of 59.5%: male literacy is 67%, and female literacy is 58%. In Majhara Pipar Ehatmali, 14% of the population is under 6 years of age.

References

Cities and towns in Unnao district